Selector Radio is a weekly two-hour radio show produced by Folded Wing for the British Council. It covers a variety of music genres, ranging from grime, indie, soul, and dance and features live sessions and DJ mixes.

Launched in 2001, as The Selector, the show is now broadcast in more than 30 countries.  In 2011, The Sunday Times likened Selector Radio to "the best of John Peel".

The show is aired in many countries.

Presenters
From the launch of Selector radio in June 2009, the presenter was Andrea Oliver. From June 2009 to September 2019, the presenter was DJ Goldierocks.

On Friday 4 October 2019, Jamz Supernova was announced as the new presenter.

Audience and global reach
With an audience estimated to be in excess of 4 million listeners, Selector is syndicated to over 30 countries around the world including Mexico, China, Malawi, Cuba, Spain and Ukraine.

Content and production
Each edition of Selector Radio includes a guest DJ mix.  The show regularly features interviews and live sessions. Guests have included  Tinie Tempah, Metronomy, Ghostpoet, Jessie Ware, Foreign Beggars, Egyptian Hip Hop, Chvrches, Errors, Daughter, Smoke Fairies and Dog Is Dead.

Selector Radio is produced by Folded Wing, an independent production company, based in Hackney, London. The show was produced by Somethin' Else until 2010. The show is produced by Cassidy Baille. Pete Linney is Executive Producer.

Awards

 In 2015, Selector Radio won World's Best Online Music Radio Show at the Mixcloud Awards. 
 In 2005 Selector received a gold award at the Sony Radio Academy Awards for Weekly Music Show Of The Year.
 In 2011 Selector was named 'International Radio Show of the Year' at the International Radio Festival in Zurich and won bronze for Best Regularly Scheduled Music Program at the New York Festivals Awards.

Airing and partner radio stations
The English version of Selector Radio is presented by Jamz Supernova

The show airs internationally.  It is also syndicated in a kit form, allowing non-English speaking presenters to create unique versions of the show in their native language. The show is also sometimes recorded overseas – in 2010 it was recorded together with partner stations in Mexico, Mauritius and Kazakhstan.

Selector is currently broadcast in the following countries:

References

External links
 Official website
 The Selector on Facebook
 The Selector on Twitter
 British Council Music website
 British Council website

British radio programmes